The Chamberlin-Johnson-DuBose Company was a leading department store in Atlanta from 1866 until 1931, competing with Rich's.

The original store was located on the east side of Whitehall St. (now Peachtree St. SW), south of Hunter St. (now King Blvd.). That block is now the location of the Fulton County Government Center.

In May 1918 the store moved "exactly 60 paces south" to new five-story building. The J.M. High Company (a.k.a. High's Department Store, benefactors of today's High Museum of Art) took over the space.

The store filed for bankruptcy in 1930 and closed the next year.

References

 Franklin M. Garrett, Atlanta and Environs: A Chronicle of Its People and Events, 1880s-1930s
 Sanborn Fire Map of Atlanta, 1911, sheet 465

Defunct department stores based in Atlanta
Demolished buildings and structures in Atlanta
Companies based in Atlanta
American companies established in 1866
Retail companies established in 1866
Retail companies disestablished in 1931
1866 establishments in Georgia (U.S. state)
1931 disestablishments in Georgia (U.S. state)
Defunct companies based in Georgia (U.S. state)